Souleymane Fall (born June 19, 1969 in Dakar) is a former Senegalese football defender who is best known for playing for Spartak Trnava. He most recently played for ŠK Modranka in the Slovak fifth league.

External links
at spartak.sk

References

1969 births
Living people
Senegalese footballers
Association football defenders
MFK Zemplín Michalovce players
FC Spartak Trnava players
FK Slovan Levice players
Footballers from Dakar
Slovak Super Liga players
5. Liga players
2. Liga (Slovakia) players
Senegalese expatriate sportspeople in Slovakia
Senegalese expatriate footballers
Expatriate footballers in Slovakia